The 2017 Moscow Sevens was the opening tournament of the 2017 Rugby Europe Grand Prix Series, hosted by Oktyabr Stadium at Moscow. It was held over the weekend of 3–4 June 2017. Ireland won the tournament, defeating Spain 12–0 in the final.

Teams

Pool Stage

Pool A

Pool B

Pool C

Knockout stage

Challenge Trophy

5th Place

Cup

Overall

References

2017
2017 in Russian rugby union
Grand Prix 1